The Danger Zone is the fourth and final posthumous album by American hip hop artist Big L, released May 31, 2011 on RBC Records.  L's brother Donald Phinazee produced most of the album and other production came from DJ Phantom. The album was originally announced on April 12, 2011, and features artists such as Gang Starr, O.C., Herb McGruff, A.G., Roc Raida, Lord Finesse as well as other D.I.T.C. members. It is the second album that contains unreleased and unheard tracks and freestyles. after Return of the Devil's Son.

The album received positive reviews and Andres Vasquez calls the album a "must have".

Track listing

Personnel 
Credits for The Danger Zone adapted from Allmusic.
 Dan Ambrose – art direction, design
 Gustavo "DJ Phantom" Guerra – executive producer
 Donald Phinazee – executive producer

Release history

References

External links 

Big L albums
albums produced by DJ Premier
2011 albums